The Gathering may refer to:

Film and television 
 The Gathering (1977 film), an American television film directed by Randal Kleiser
 The Gathering (1998 film), an American thriller film directed by Danny Carrales
 The Gathering (2003 film), a British thriller/horror film directed by Brian Gilbert
 The Gathering (miniseries), a 2007 American thriller starring Peter Fonda
 The Gathering (audio drama), a 2006 audio drama based on the television programme Doctor Who
 The Gathering, a contest among immortals in the Highlander franchise
 Babylon 5: The Gathering, the 1993 pilot movie for Babylon 5

TV episodes 
 "The Gathering" (Gargoyles)
 "The Gathering" (Ghost Whisperer)
 "The Gathering" (Highlander: The Series), pilot
 "The Gathering" (Outlander)
 "The Gathering" (Star Wars: The Clone Wars)
 "The Gathering" (Torchwood)

Literature 
 The Gathering (Armstrong novel), a 2011 novel by Kelley Armstrong
 The Gathering (Carmody novel), a 1993 novel by Isobelle Carmody
 The Gathering (Carroll novel) or Sakkara, a 2006 New Heroes/Quantum Prophecy novel by Michael Carroll
 The Gathering (Enright novel), a 2007 novel by Anne Enright
 Al-Hashr, "The Gathering",  59th chapter (sura) of the Qur'an

Music 
 The Gathering (band), a Dutch rock band
 The Gathering, a New Zealand music festival

Albums 
 The Gathering (Arbouretum album), 2011
 The Gathering (Caribbean Jazz Project album) or the title song, 2002
 The Gathering (Geri Allen album) or the title song, 1998
 The Gathering (Jorn album), 2007
 The Gathering (Magnum album), 2010
 The Gathering (Rashanim album), 2009
 The Gathering (Testament album), 1999
 The Gathering (compilation album), a Canadian collection of world music artists, 1991
 The Gathering (EP) or the title song, by Living Legends, 2008
 City on a Hill: The Gathering or the title song, from the City on a Hill series, 2003
 The Gathering, by Diane Schuur, 2011
 The Gathering, by Infected Mushroom, 1999
 The Gathering, by Kathryn Tickell, 1997
 The Gathering DVD (2005) and The Gathering album (2010), by Magenta
 The Gathering, a compilation of Irish traditional music featuring Andy Irvine and other artists, 1981

Songs 
 "The Gathering", by Delain, 2008
 "The Gathering", by Freedom Call from The Circle of Life, 2005

Sports and games 
 The Gathering (professional wrestling), an incarnation of the Raven's Nest stable
 Magic: The Gathering, a trading card game
 The Gathering, a live-action role-playing game event run by Lorien Trust
 The Gathering, a role-playing event at the Origins Game Fair managed by Paradigm Concepts

Other uses 
 Gathering of the Juggalos, or The Gathering, an annual festival
 The Gathering (LAN party), an annual computer party in Norway
 The Gathering 2009, an event celebrating Scottish culture
 The Gathering Ireland 2013, a tourism initiative for the Irish diaspora
 The Gathering, a 2005 stage show by Derren Brown

See also 
 Gathering (disambiguation)